Ignacio Jaime Achurra Díaz (born 19 October 1979) is a Chilean lawyer and actor who is member of the Chilean Constitutional Convention.

References

External links
 

Living people
1979 births
21st-century Chilean politicians
Members of the Autonomist Movement
Members of the Chilean Constitutional Convention
Social Convergence politicians
People from Santiago
Chilean television actors
Chilean television personalities
21st-century Chilean actors
Chilean actor-politicians